Siswa Bazar is a small Indian town towards the east of the province of Uttar Pradesh in northern India, near the border with Nepal.

Name
The name of the town came from the market of Shessham trees which came from the rivers in Nepal. Hence, its original name was "Shesshamwa ke bazar", but over the years, it became known as Siswa Bazar.

Transport 
Siswa Bazar railway station is situated on Muzaffarpur–Gorakhpur main line under the Varanasi railway division of North Eastern Railway zone.

Geography
It has an average elevation of 89 metres (295 feet).

References

Cities and towns in Maharajganj district